Tall Ships and Salty Dogs is a 1979 album by the music group The Irish Rovers.

Track listing 
Side One
"Day the Tall Ships Came"
"New York Girls"
"Bluenose"
"Cape Anne"
"Missionary's Child"
"Old Balena"
"Rio Grande"
"Blow the Man Down"
"Jigs"

Side Two
"I'm Alone at Lunenburg NS"
"Sloop John B"
"Wanderer and the Whale"
"Foolish Old Man"
"If We Weren't Devils"
"Dublin O'Shea"
"Instrumental"
"Let the Lower Lights Be Burning"
"McDonald's Rangers and The Battle of Garvagh"

The Irish Rovers albums
1979 albums
Maritime culture